The Pfister Siblings is a Swiss-German comedy band founded in Berlin in the early 1990s. Their music incorporates elements of folk, pop, bossa nova, vaudeville, swing, and yodeling. In 2022, Mannschraft Magazin described them as a "queer music cabaret trio."

Formation 
In the 1990s, actors Christopher Marti, Tobias Bonn, Max Gertsch, and Lilian Naef formed the group at the Schiller Theater. They created fictional personas as 4 orphan siblings from Zermatt, Switzerland.

Music 
In 2009, they released In The Clinic, which includes a cover of Esther & Abi Ofarim's 1968 novelty single, "Cinderella Rockefella," performed by two men. The album also includes an a cappella version of "Spider Pig," a brief song sung by Homer Simpson in 2007 film The Simpsons Movie, which in turn is a parody of the Spider-Man theme song.

Awards and legacy 
The group was awarded Berliner Kritikerpreis in 1992. In 1993, they won the Salzburger Stier Award, an annual award for "the best cabaret artists and satirists from German-speaking countries."

In 1995, they won the Prix Walo, a Swiss show business award sometimes referred to as a "Swiss Oscar."

They were portrayed in the 1995 documentary Magic Matterhorn.

In 2014, the group won the B.Z.-Kulturpreis.

The 2021 Historical Dictionary of Berlin names The Pfister Siblings as one of the city's most important performers.

In Spring 2022, the original four members reunited to perform again, for the first time in 30 years. The Berliner Morgenpost claimed it was "almost like ABBA."

In 2022, they were awarded the Swiss Culture Prize.

See also 

 Max Raabe and the Palast Orchester, a jazz big band in Berlin that recreates 1920s and 1930s big band music

References 

Cabaret performers
Cabaret in Europe
Musical groups from Berlin
German comedy musical groups
Swiss comedy
LGBT-themed musical groups